The 1926 season was Wisła Krakóws 18th year as a club.

Friendlies

A-Klasa

League standings

Polish Cup

Squad, appearances and goals

|-
|}

Goalscorers

External links
1926 Wisła Kraków season at historiawisly.pl

Wisła Kraków seasons
Association football clubs 1926 season
Wisla